Kim Moritsugu is a Canadian writer. An alumna of the University of Toronto, she worked in a corporate setting for several years before publishing her debut novel, Looks Perfect, in 1996. She has since published three more novels, and teaches creative writing at Humber College's School for Writers.

Looks Perfect was a nominee for the City of Toronto Book Award in 1996, and The Glenwood Treasure was a nominee for the Arthur Ellis Award for Best Crime Novel in 2004.

Moritsugu also maintains a food blog, The Hungry Novelist.

Works
 Looks Perfect (1996)
 Old Flames (1999)
 The Glenwood Treasure (2003)
 The Restoration of Emily (2006)
 And Everything Nice (2011)
 The Oakdale Dinner Club (2013)
 The Showrunner (2018)

References

External links
 Kim Moritsugu

20th-century Canadian novelists
21st-century Canadian novelists
Canadian writers of Asian descent
Canadian bloggers
Canadian women novelists
Canadian people of Japanese descent
Writers from Toronto
Living people
Canadian women bloggers
20th-century Canadian women writers
21st-century Canadian women writers
Year of birth missing (living people)